The Urdhva Pundra is a tilaka worn by Vaishnavas as an indication of their affiliation with Vishnu. It is generally worn on the forehead, but may also be worn on other parts of the body such as the shoulders. The markings are made either as a daily ritual, or on special occasions, and denote the particular sampradaya, or the lineage to which the devotee belongs. The different Vaishnava sampradayas each have their own distinctive style of tilaka based on the siddhanta of their particular lineage. The general tilaka design is of two or three vertical lines resembling the letter U, which represent the feet of Vishnu.

Literature

The Urdhava Pundra has historically been associated with the Vaishnava tradition, just as the Tripundra has been associated with the Shaiva tradition.  

The Padma Purana explains the theological significance of this symbol: 

 

The Vasudeva Upanishad, a Vaishnava text, explains the significance of the three vertical lines in the Urdhva Pundra Tilaka, offering a number of interpretations: 

The Skanda Purana also offers some details regarding the mark:

Association with Vishnu's names 
In Vaishnava tradition, the Urdhva Pundra is applied on different regions of an individual's body, and its application requires one to ritually invoke the various names of Vishnu. The Devi Bhagavata Purana sheds some light on this concept in the form of an order in which the mark is applied, correlating each with an epithet of the preserver deity:

 Keshava - Forehead
 Narayana - Stomach
 Madhava - Heart
 Govinda - Neck
 Vishnu - Right-section of stomach
 Madhusudana - Middle of right hand
 Trivikrama - Left ear
 Vamana - Left-section of stomach
 Sridhara - Left hand
 Hrishikesha - Right ear
 Padmanabha - Hind
 Damodara - Nape
 Vasudeva - Head

Traditional variations

Sri Vaishnavism 
The mark here is called the namam or the sricharanam. Members of the Sri Vaishnava tradition wear the tilaka with the two outer lines representing the feet of Narayana, and the red line in the middle that represents his consort, Lakshmi. A curvature upon the top bridge of the nose indicates that the wearer belongs to the Tenkalai denomination. Because the Sri Vaishnava tradition accords a high place to Lakshmi, and because they approach Narayana through Lakshmi, their tilaka reflects this process of surrender, known as saranagati (or sometimes also prapatti). A variant to this is found within the Ramanandi sect, begun by Ramananda, whose members wear a similar tilaka design, but with reference to Sita and Rama (to whom their devotion is offered) rather than Lakshmi and Narayana.

The women of the Sri Vaishnava tradition, especially the ones who hail from the Iyengar community, wear a different tilaka from the men. The red line that represents Lakshmi is worn prominently upon the length of their forehead to highlight their femininity, adorned with a miniature white curvature at the base of the design.

Iyengar tradition 
In South India's Iyengar community, there are two forms of tilakas present, referred to as the namam. There exist two components of this mark present in both denominations: 

 Tiruman (sacred sand) - The white, lateral symbolism that represents the feet of Vishnu
 Sricharanam (sacred feet) - The yellow/red central symbolism that represents the presence of Lakshmi

Tenkalai 

The Tenkalai namam is a Y-shaped design that incorporates two vertical white lines upon the forehead that intersect upon the bridge of the nose, where they are aligned by the wearer. This is representative of the feet of Vishnu. A red line that is usually applied with kumkumam is worn in its midst as a representation of Lakshmi.

Vadakalai 

The Vadakalai are among the two denominations of the Iyengar community of Tamil Brahmins. The Vadakalai namam is a U-shaped design that incorporates two curved lines upon the forehead. As in the Tenkalai namam, this is representative of the feet of Vishnu. A yellow line that is usually applied with a turmeric paste is worn in its midst as a representation of Lakshmi.

Vallabha sampradaya

In the Vallabha tradition, or the Rudra sampradaya, the tilaka worn is  a double vertical red line which is rounded at the base. This "U" shape represents Krishna's lotus feet.

Madhva sampradaya
The Madhva Sampradaya mark two vertical lines with Gopichandana representing Vishnu's 'lotus feet'. In between a vertical black line is made from the daily coal of the dhupa (incense). In this sampradaya, worship is done to Narayana or Krishna daily. The coal left after offering incense is used to mark the black line. This is called as angara. Those who are wearing this line have finished the Devara Puja (worship). Underneath the black line,  red dot is added to indicate that one has finished eating their lunch. This dot is called as akshate. It is the ash of the banana tree flower petal mixed with turmeric paste. The shape of angara-akshate is like that of a gada. It is supposed to be Pranadeva Sannidhi (have the presence of Vayu Devaru).  Those who did not perform daily worship to Narayana wear the simple two line tilaka only.

Gaudiya Vaishnavism

In the Gaudiya Vaishnava sampradaya, the tilaka is usually made out of mud from Vrindavan. The main tilaka is basically identical to the Madhva tilaka. Below the two lines, on the bridge of the nose is the shape of a tulsi leaf, while other Vaishnava groups may instead feature the shape of the neem or asoka leaf. The slight difference arose due to the emphasis on direct devotional service such as hearing from the shastras and glorifying the Lord in accordance with Srimad-Bhagavatam. As such, the black line made from the ash of the fire sacrifice is not included. As per Sri Hari Bhakti Vilasa (4.211), the tilaka is a U that begins from the beginning of the nose which is technically 1/3rd the distance from the base to the tip. In due course of time, this original tilaka was modified to suit various divisions and sects.

Nimbarka sampradaya

In Nimbarka Sampradaya, the tilaka is made of Gopi-Chandana (the clay from Gopi Kunda lake in Dwarka, Gujarat), as described in the Vasudeva Upanishad. It starts at the bridge of the nose and continues as two vertical lines to the top of the forehead. This is said to represent the temple of God. Within these lines, between the eyebrows is a black dot, made from the slate found in Barsana, Uttar Pradesh, the sacred birthplace of Radha. This is said to represent God as Radha and Krishna together. This tilaka personifies the tenets of the Sampradaya, that God is Radha and Krishna together, none else. It is supposed to have been first given to Nimbarka at the time of his initiation by the sage, Narada. The tilaka is first given to an initiate by their guru at the time of initiation, and after this, daily the devotee will remember his guru before he adorns the tilaka on his head.

Swaminarayan Sampradaya

In the Swaminarayan Sampradaya, the urdhva pundra tilaka, also known as the tilaka chandlo, is composed of two elements: a "U"-shaped tilaka made of sandalwood paste and a chandlo (circle) made of kumkuma (vermillion) in the center. It is applied before the morning puja.  

According to the Swaminarayan Gadis, the symbol represents Lakshmi, the goddess of wealth and fortune, living in the heart of Swaminarayan wherein the tilaka represents the lotus feet of SHRI KRISHNA, the supreme being, and the chandlo stands for Lakshmi. The BAPS interpret the tilaka chandlo to indicate the bhakta-bhagavan mode of worshipping Paramatma along with his ideal devotee, the Gunatit Sadhu. Swaminarayan proclaimed that all devotees should wear the mark  on 13 February 1821 during the Holi festival in Panchala, near Junagadh, Gujarat, after demonstrating the tilaka chandlo on Gunatitanand Swami.

See also

Hindu philosophy
Vibhuti
Tilaka

References

Vaishnavism
Hindu traditions
Hindu symbols